Great Grand Masti is a 2016 Indian Hindi-language supernatural horror adult black comedy film directed by Indra Kumar. It is the third installment in the Masti (film series) after Masti (2004) and Grand Masti (2013). It is produced by Sameer Nair, Aman Gill, Ashok Thakeria, Markand Adhikari and Anand Pandit.

It features Riteish Deshmukh, Vivek Oberoi, Aftab Shivdasani and Urvashi Rautela in the lead roles along with Shraddha Das, Mishti Chakraborty, Pooja Bose and Sanjay Mishra in the pivotal roles. Originally scheduled to release on 22 July 2016, the date was advanced to 15 July 2016 after a pirated copy of the film was reportedly leaked online. Censor Board made 23 deletions from the film including some dialogue deletions and a complete scene  and gave the film an A certificate.

Plot
Amar, Meet, and Prem are three friends who always wanted fun. They are married to Sapna, Rekha, and Nisha and live an unhappy life with their wives because of their mother-in-law, brother-in-law and sister-in-law respectively. Amar's mother-in-law wants her late husband to be reborn and on the order of a fraud Baba (honorific), she has stopped her daughter from having any physical relations with Amar for over 6 months to achieve the rebirth of her late husband. Meet's wife is a twin and whenever he tries to go near his wife, it turns on his brother-in-law (who is a bodybuilder). The connection between the twins causes great problems like Meet's wife beating him up unintentionally when her brother is beating up some goon. Prem's sister-in-law is very hot yet very silly, she comes to live with them and wants to sleep with her elder sister, forcing Prem to sleep on the couch away from his wife.

One day they meet in a bar and decide to enjoy their lives together. They decide to go to Amar's village to sell off his family Haveli (old mansion) and meanwhile have fun with the hot and sexy ladies in the village. When they reach the village, they find out that people are scared of the Haveli. An old man tells them that there used to be a father-daughter duo who lived in the haveli 50 years ago, the daughter, Ragini was very beautiful and many boys were smitten by her beauty but her father never let any guy near her. At the age of 20, Ragini died due to snake bite but her soul still resides in the haveli in search of a man who'll do masti with her. 
The guys laugh it off and proceed towards the haveli, there they meet a very hot girl who's been living secretly in the haveli as she is alone and has nowhere to go. The boys hire her as their maid and each one starts trying to attract her. Soon it is revealed that she is indeed Ragini and she informs the boys that one of them must have sex with her in order to free her soul and whoever does so will die. The boys get scared and try escaping the mansion but to no avail. Prem commits to doing so in front of Ragini to buy them some time and meanwhile they hire Babu Rangeela, a male prostitute to have sex with Ragini. But on the last moment their wives show up and Ragini turns Babu into a chicken. Ragini makes the boys do weird stuff in front of their wives and in-laws who join them at the haveli so they would leave. When the boys see that their wives are secretly fasting for them even when Ragini depicted them off as such perverts in front of them, they decide to confront Ragini. They meet Ragini and tell her they won't have sex with her and she can't harm them as their wives are fasting for their long lives. Ragini hurts them but they light a fire around her and call her father's spirit to help them. Rather Babu's spirit comes (who was cooked by the three wives) and has sex with Ragini hence satisfying her urge. Babu and Ragini leave the world together and the three couples live happily ever after.

Cast 
 Riteish Deshmukh as Amar Saxena
 Aftab Shivdasani as Prem Chawla
 Vivek Oberoi as Meet Mehta
 Urvashi Rautela as Ragini (ghost) / Shabri (maid)
 Shreyas Talpade as Babu Rangeela
 Puja Banerjee as Sapna Amar Saxena
 Mishti Chakraborty as Rekha Meet Mehta
 Shraddha Das as Nisha Prem Chawla
 Kangna Sharma as Prem's sister-in-law
 Usha Nadkarni as Amar's mother-in-law
 Ketan Karande as Meet's brother-in-law
 Sanjay Mishra as Antakshari Baba

Cameo appearances
 Sonali Raut as Shiney
 Sudesh Lehri as Ramse
 Ghazal Sharma as Ritu

Music
The music for Great Grand Masti is composed by Sanjeev-Darshan, Shaarib-Toshi, Superbia (Shaan, Gourov & Roshin). The lyrics have been penned by Sameer Anjaan, Manoj Yadav and Kumaar. The music rights have been acquired by Zee Music Company. The first song "Teri Kamar Ko" was released on 21 June 2016. The song 'Lipstick Laga Ke' had become so much popular and was one of the top 20 songs of 2016.

Release

Online piracy issue 
On 5 July 2016, two weeks ahead of its nationwide release on 22 July 2016, a pirated copy of the film was reported to be shared online on various sites and was hosted on several peer-to-peer sharing websites like Kickass Torrents and The Pirate Bay. According to investigators, the leaked copy carried a watermark, implying that it was created from the sample copy sent by the producers to the CBFC for reviewing purposes.

Box office 
The film was a box office bomb.

Controversies
On 15 July 2016, actor Shiney Ahuja sent a legal notice to the film's producers accusing them of criminal contempt for naming a maid Shiney in the film. A member of Ahuja's legal representation alleged that this was a reference to Ahuja's 2011 conviction for raping a maid in his employ.

References

External links
 
 

2010s Hindi-language films
2010s buddy comedy films
2016 comedy horror films
2010s sex comedy films
Indian sex comedy films
Indian buddy comedy films
Indian sequel films
2016 films
Films directed by Indra Kumar
Films scored by Sanjeev Darshan
Balaji Motion Pictures films
Indian comedy horror films
2016 comedy films